Obe Dve is a Russian band from Ekaterinburg, fronted by Ekaterina Pavlova. They have released four albums "Znaesh shto ya delala" (2011), "Doch ribaka" (2015),  ЕР "Mal'chik" (2017) and EP "Mal'chik (Acoustic)" (2017).

Beginnings

The group began in 2006, with a collaboration between Ekaterina and her sister Tatiana. When Tatiana left the group to pursue theatrical interests, Asi Kucherovoi from girl-group 'Sansara' joined Obe Dve, making them again two. The two bands began collaborating together for some time, performing and recording several tracks. The band is currently located in Moscow, Russia.

References

Russian musical groups